Delta Rae is an American folk rock band formed in Durham, North Carolina. The band consists of three siblings Ian Hölljes (vocals and guitar), Eric Hölljes (vocals, guitar, piano and keys) and Brittany Hölljes (vocals), as well as Elizabeth Hopkins (vocals), Mike McKee (percussion) and Grant Emerson (bass guitar). The band feels that they do not fit into a single musical genre, but have described their sound as "gospel-tinged country-rock, sensual blue-eyed soul and harmony-laden Americana.”

History

Hölljes siblings 
Three of the members of Delta Rae are siblings and members of the Hölljes family.  They grew up in the San Francisco Bay Area where their parents instilled in them a love of music, reading, and education.

Ian and Eric Hölljes began writing music together when they were just 12 and 10-years-old, respectively. The two of them write most of the songs for Delta Rae's music today.

The siblings grew up hearing stories of folklore, mythology, and mysticism from their mother, a Montessori school teacher. She would read Greek mythology to them and often make up melodies and music to accompany the stories. In fact, the band's name hails from a fictional story the Hölljes' mother wrote about a Southern girl named Delta Rae who summons the Greek gods to earth. Their mother is currently writing a book about this southern heroine.

The three Hölljes siblings joined a teen a cappella group as middle schoolers in San Rafael, California called 'Til Dawn where they learned both how to write musical arrangements and how to sing as a group. In this a cappella group, they also met and became friends with their future Delta Rae bandmate, Elizabeth Hopkins.

Band formation 
The band debuted at Duke University in October 2009. Ian graduated from Duke in 2007; Eric graduated from Duke in 2009. After Brittany graduated early from University of California, Berkeley, also in 2009, and Liz had graduated from Fordham University, the band members all moved into a big house in the woods in Durham, North Carolina and officially became a band in September 2009.

In 2010, the band added Mike McKee, who graduated from Campbell University, and Grant Emerson, who graduated from University of North Carolina Wilmington. The 6-person formation is still in place today.

Career 
Their self-titled debut EP was released in 2010, after which they signed to Sire Records in 2012. Their debut album Carry the Fire was released on June 19, 2012. It included the singles "Morning Comes", "Dance in the Graveyards" and "Bottom of the River" which received airplay on VH1.

On November 19, 2013, they released the EP Chasing Twisters which included a new version of their single "If I Loved You" featuring Fleetwood Mac guitarist Lindsey Buckingham.  Delta Rae toured in support of this release for much of 2014, including a set at Lollapalooza.

The band performed with other musicians at the 29th annual Farm Aid event, which was held on September 13, 2014, at Walnut Creek Amphitheatre in Raleigh, North Carolina.

Delta Rae released their second album After It All on April 7, 2015. It was preceded by the single "Scared" in addition to an East Coast tour.

In April 2015, they played their first Australian dates as part of the Byron Bay Bluesfest, which included Counting Crows and Jurassic 5.

The band relocated to Nashville and signed with Big Machine Label Group in February 2017 after a personnel shake-up at Warner. They quickly followed up with a couple of EP releases, A Long and Happy Life and The Blackbird Sessions.

From September through December 2018, they held a weekly residency in Nashville. Cheap Trick performed on the opening night.

In July 2019, Delta Rae announced they would be leaving Big Machine and a Kickstarter campaign was launched for a double album project - The Light and The Dark. The campaign passed the $30,000 goal immediately, making $60,000 within the first hour the campaign was live. It gained a significant boost as Taylor Swift’s fans reacted to her comments on the Big Machine buyout. The overwhelming response raised over fifteen times the original goal and saw them become the fifth biggest music Kickstarter campaign. The first installment of the Kickstarter, titled The Light, was released on March 20, 2020.

Eric Holljes has worked as a producer on other projects, including the upcoming album from Carrie Welling entitled High Heels and Heavy Things. Welling was scheduled to be part of Delta Rae's 2020 tour, which was cancelled due to the COVID-19 outbreak.

The Dark a sister album to The Light, was released in 2021.

Discography

Studio albums

Live albums

Extended plays

Singles

Videography

Guest appearances

References 

2009 establishments in North Carolina
American blues rock musical groups
American country rock groups
American folk rock groups
Culture of Durham, North Carolina
Musical groups established in 2009
Musical groups from North Carolina
Sibling musical groups